Janus Capital Group, Inc. was an American publicly owned investment firm headquartered in Denver, Colorado.

The company's asset-management disciplines included growth, core, international, value, mathematical, alternative and fixed-income. These products were sold through advisors and financial intermediaries, to institutional investors and directly to retail investors.

Janus Capital Group was created as a result of the January 1, 2003, merger of Janus Capital Corporation into its parent company, Stilwell Financial Inc. Janus Capital Group consists of Janus Capital Management LLC (Janus), Intech Investment Management LLC (Intech), and Kapstream Capital Pty Limited (Kapstream), in addition to a range of exchange‐traded products. Additionally, Janus Capital Group owns 80% of Perkins Investment Management (formerly Perkins, Wolf, McDonnell and Company).

Outside the U.S., Janus had offices in Sydney, Paris, Zurich, Frankfurt, Dubai, Taipei, London, Milan, Tokyo, Hong Kong, Melbourne, and Singapore. Janus is in the S&P MidCap 400 Index.

It merged with Henderson Group in May 2017 to create Janus Henderson.

History
Janus was founded in 1969 by Thomas H. Bailey. A controlling interest was purchased by Kansas City Southern Industries in 1984. Bailey stepped down as president and CEO in June 2002.

The firm was formerly known as Stilwell Financial Incorporated.  The company was renamed following the January 2003 merger of Janus Capital Corporation into its parent company, Stilwell Financial.

The Janus Fund opened in 1970 with approximately $500,000 in assets and 30 investors. Its primary business was U.S. large cap growth equity management.

Further funds were launched in 1985, including the Janus Venture Fund, its first small cap equity fund, and the Janus Twenty Fund, its first concentrated equity fund. At the same time, Janus began managing assets for institutional clients.

In 1991, Janus launched a number of other new types of fund, including its first global equity fund, the Janus Worldwide Fund, its first international equity fund, the Janus Overseas Fund, and its first mid cap equity fund, the Janus Enterprise Fund. It also launched the Janus Aspen Series (JAS), a product line created for investors wanting to invest in Janus through variable insurance contracts or certain qualified retirement plans. Janus also became available through fund supermarkets for both retail shareholders and financial planners.

Myron Scholes, Nobel laureate and Ph.D., joined Janus as chief investment strategist on July 8, 2014 On September 26, 2014, Bill Gross left Pimco to join Janus as manager of the Janus global unconstrained bond strategy. In October 2014, Janus acquired VS Holdings, a company based in Darien, Connecticut, and its VelocityShares business. In July 2015, Janus acquired a majority interest in Kapstream Capital, a fixed income specialist. In February 2016, Janus launched a small cap growth and small cap/mid cap growth ETF,  followed in June by four new ETFs around investment themes – long-term care, health and fitness, organic foods and personal care (including health care issues related to obesity). On October 3, 2016, Janus Capital Group Inc and Henderson Group plc announced a recommended merger of equals to create Janus Henderson.

References

External links

Companies based in Denver
Investment management companies of the United States
Companies formerly listed on the New York Stock Exchange
Financial services companies established in 1969
1969 establishments in Colorado
Financial services companies disestablished in 2017
2017 disestablishments in Colorado
2017 mergers and acquisitions